Adhuri Kahaani Hamari ( Our incomplete story) is an Indian romantic fantasy drama television series that premiered on 16 November 2015 on &TV. Produced by Gul Khan under the banner of 4 Lions Films, it stars Laksh Lalwani and Mahima Makwana.

Plot
Manasvini "Manu" (Mahima Makwana) is killed by an ichhadhaari naagin (a shape-shifting snake) named Maya at the age of 16. Maya is jealous of Prince Madhav's (Laksh Lalwani) attention towards Manu, and to take Manu's place in Madhav's life, Maya kills her.

Years later, Manasvini's soul returns as Radhika, who is a film-making student. Radhika lands up in Narayanpuri, where the ancient Garuda Temple is located. Radhika comes to terms with her past life during this journey as Manasvini, and some intriguing secrets are revealed to her about Manasvini, Madhav and Maya's relationship. The characters are shown in the past, where Maya kills each family member and tries to kill Manu. By mistake, Madhav is hurt, Manu stabs Maya with a Trishul, and Maya bites Manu. The three of them die together.

Back in the present, Radhika finds Krish, who is Madhav's reborn form and marries him with the help of Tulsi, a shape-shifting snake who comes to unite Radhika and Krish to undo the evil done to the loving couple on behalf of the Naagvansh. In Krish's house, Preeti, his sister-in-law, is a daayan, (a witch), and has a hidden motive. She tortures Radhika by abducting Krish. She tries to kill Radhika, but Radhika is saved by Tulsi, who gives her her powers, thus making her a naagin. Radhika uses these powers to transform Preeti into a human being any special powers.

In the end, Radhika avenges Krish by killing the daayan Preeti.

Cast

Main
Laksh Lalwani as Yuvraj Madhav / Krish
Mahima Makwana as Manasvini "Manu " (Devrakshika) / Radhika

Recurring

Before rebirth story (2015-2016) 
Suhani Dhanki as Maya, an evil naagin
Nitin Sahrawat as Raja Lakshman Dev
Amrapali Gupta as Anamika, Queen of Naag vansh, Bade Raja's lover
Gajendra Chauhan as Bade Raja, Madhav's father
Pragati Mehra as Maithali, Badi Rani, Madhav's mother
Nitin Sahrawat as Chhote Raja, Bade Raja's younger brother
Preet Kaur Madhan as Chotti Rani, Chhote Raja's wife
Shubhangi Atre Poorey as Devsena, Manasvini's aunt, former Devrakshika
 Juhi Aslam as Takshika, Maya's assistant, head of the ichhadhaari naags

Post rebirth story (2016) 

Himani Shivpuri as Radhika's aunt
Nupur Alankar as Krish's mother
Unknown as Balvinder, Krish's uncle
Dolly Minhas as Pammi, Balvinder's wife
Love Kwatra as Om, Krish's elder brother
Unknown as Mehak, Krish's sister
Kashvi Kothari as Tulsi, a young naagin who later transfers her power to Radhika
Nisha Nagpal as Avni, Mehak's friend
 Ronit Chauhan as Purushharth, Balvinder and Pammi's son, Avni's husband
Unknown as Baba Gorakdas, a snake charmer and helps Preeti in assassinating Radhika
Pratyusha Banerjee as Naagin (Cameo appearance in song)
Rashami Desai as Preeti, Krish's sister-in-law and a daayan ( antagonist)
Deepshikha Nagpal as Daayani, Preeti's evil sister

History

Controversy
There were rumors that Mahima slapped Laksh during a rehearsal of &TV holi event. However, later on in an interview Laksh clarified the rumors and said:

After the holi incident there were news of Mahima being replaced by Sanjeeda Sheikh or Sara Khan from the show. Nevertheless, she continued in the show. In an interview with tellychakkar.com she said:

In March 2016 an intimate scene was being to be shot between Laksh aka Krish and Mahima aka Radhika. However, Mahima denied doing it. During a press interview, she said:

Accidents
In November 2015, Mahima got injured on the set while shooting for a prominent jail sequence, wherein she had to run away breaking the chains. However, she ended up injuring her head while shooting for it. Nevertheless, she continued to shoot and completed her scene. Later on, people on the sets panicked and took her to the doctor to get the CT scan done. During a press interview she said:

Again in March 2017, Nupur Alankar got injured while shooting for a death sequence.

Adaptations

The series was dubbed in Thai and was broadcast in Thailand on Bright TV20 and on Zee Anmol as Kasam Hai Tujhe Aa Bhi Jaa. The series ended on 13 May 2016.

References

External links

official website

2015 Indian television series debuts
2016 Indian television series endings
Hindi-language television shows
Indian drama television series
&TV original programming
Television series by 4 Lions Films